This article features the discography of Kosovo-Albanian singer and songwriter Ardian Bujupi. His discography includes five studio albums, one extended play and numerous singles as a lead artist and featured artist. Bujupi has released five studio albums and thirty singles as a leading artist including four as a featured artist. In 2011, Bujupi premiered his first studio album To the Top which debuted at number 78 and 98 on the German and Swiss album charts respectively. In 2019, he released his fifth studio album Rahat which entered the album charts at number 32 in Germany, number 67 in Austria and 38 in Switzerland.

Albums

Studio albums

Extended plays

Singles

As lead artist

As featured artist

References 

Discographies of Albanian artists
Discographies of German artists